Brian Christopher Deese (born February 17, 1978) is an American economic and political advisor who was the 13th Director of the National Economic Council, serving under President Joe Biden. In February 2023, it was reported that Deese would depart from the Biden administration.

He previously served as a senior advisor to President Barack Obama. Earlier in the Obama administration, Deese served as the deputy director and acting director of the Office of Management and Budget. Deese also served as deputy director of the National Economic Council. Deese served as the Global Head of Sustainable Investing at BlackRock.

Early life and education 
Deese was born in Belmont, Massachusetts. He earned a Bachelor of Arts degree in political science from Middlebury College in 2000 and a Juris Doctor from Yale Law School in 2009. In 2002, Deese was named a finalist for the Rhodes Scholarship, though he was not ultimately selected.

Career 
Deese worked as a junior fellow at the Carnegie Endowment for International Peace and as a research assistant at the Center for Global Development, hired by founder Nancy Birdsall, according to The New York Times, where he co-authored the book Delivering on Debt Relief. Later he worked as a senior policy analyst for economic policy at the Center for American Progress, under Gene Sperling.

Clinton and Obama 2008 presidential campaigns
After the Center for American Progress, Deese joined Hillary Clinton's presidential campaign as her economic policy director. After Clinton was defeated in the primaries, Deese went to work as an economic advisor to the Barack Obama 2008 presidential campaign.

Following the 2008 presidential election, he served as a member of the Economic Policy Working Group for the presidential transition.

Obama administration

National Economic Council 
At the start of the Obama presidency, Deese was appointed as a special assistant to the president for economic policy, serving in the National Economic Council (NEC). According to The New York Times, he emerged as "one of the most influential voices" on the auto industry, and specifically the Chrysler and GM bailout. Deese argued against the government letting Chrysler liquidate based on a concern around the impact on industrial communities across the mid-west.

In 2011, Deese was named deputy director of the NEC. In this role, he coordinated policy development for the White House on taxes, financial regulation, housing, clean energy, manufacturing, and the automotive industry. According to The New Republic, he was among Washington's "most powerful, least famous people".

Office of Management and Budget 
Deese was named deputy director of the Office of Management and Budget in the summer of 2013. He briefly served as the acting director in summer 2014, between the departure of Sylvia Mathews Burwell and the appointment of Shaun Donovan.

Senior Advisor to the President 
Following the departure of John Podesta, Deese took over his brief on climate and energy. Unlike Podesta, who served as Counselor to the President, Deese was promoted to the position of Senior Advisor to the President. In this position, Deese played an influential role in negotiating the Paris Climate Agreement in December 2015 working to secure climate agreements with China, India, Brazil, and other countries. Deese also chaired the Major Economies Forum on Energy and Climate in 2015 and 2016. Deese spearheaded the Administration's effort to ratify the Paris Agreement and to reach a global agreement to phase down hydrofluorocarbons (HFC's) through the Kigali Amendment to the Montreal Protocol. Deese also oversaw the Obama Administration's efforts to protect more land and water than any previous president, including the largest protected marine monument in the world.

Along with Katie Beirne Fallon, Deese helped to negotiate the 2015 Bipartisan Budget Act, which replaced the budget sequestration and increased federal spending by $80 billion over two years. In February 2016, the President tapped Deese to oversee the Supreme Court nomination process, which led to the President's nomination of Chief Judge Merrick Garland to the Supreme Court on March 16, 2016.

BlackRock

As Global Head of Sustainable Investing from October 2017 until December 2020, Deese led BlackRock's Sustainable Investing Team which "is focused on identifying drivers of long-term return associated with environmental, social and governance issues." In an interview with The Weather Channel, Deese was asked about BlackRock's "heavy investments" in the fossil fuel industry. Deese said that BlackRock's role is to provide clients with "more choices and more options" in investments and "this is not just about excluding entire industries or entire classes of companies, but it’s also about getting to understand, again, which of these companies is better positioned for the transition."

During this time his salary was at least $2.3 million, with the possibility that through BlackRock’s restricted stock plan, Deese could have made an additional $2.4 million.

Biden administration
On December 3, 2020, President-elect Biden appointed Deese as Assistant to the President and Director of the National Economic Council. In this role, Deese coordinates international and domestic economic policy for the administration. Deese has been a principal architect of the Biden economic agenda, including the American Rescue Plan, the Bipartisan Infrastructure Law, the CHIPS and Science Act, and the Inflation Reduction Act.

At the NEC, Deese was the first and last person Biden consulted on economic issues and was a driving force behind the President's domestic policy legacy. According to Biden, "Brian has a unique ability to translate complex policy challenges into concrete actions that improve the lives of American people." Deese is also credited with assembling the most diverse staff in terms of race and gender in the council’s history.

Deese served as a central figure in congressional negotiations leading up to the passage of the Bipartisan Infrastructure Law. Between the spring and fall of 2021, Brian Deese, Steve Ricchetti, and Louisa Terrell were frequent visitors to Capitol Hill, brokering policy conversations and building a coalition of support among Senate Democrats and Republicans.

In April 2022, Deese laid out the case behind the administration’s pursuit of a modern industrial strategy, stating: “The question should move from ‘why should we pursue an industrial strategy?’ to ‘how do we pursue one successfully?’” Deese worked closely with Secretary Gina Raimondo to design and advocate for the CHIPS and Science Act, viewing it as an essential component to the President's industrial strategy. Upon passage, Deese was directed by President Biden to co-chair the new law's 16-member implementation council. 

Deese also served as President Biden's primary policy negotiator for key climate, health, and tax reform measures passed in the Inflation Reduction Act. Deese was particularly involved in landing the clean energy and climate provisions, visiting West Virginia with Senator Manchin in March 2022. After going zip-lining with the senator near the New River Gorge, Deese took to Twitter to extoll the state. "Coal and energy communities helped make America what it is, the strongest economy in the world and the global leader of democracy," Deese wrote. "Nobody should forget that, and President Biden certainly doesn't." Deese later participated in the final bill negotiations, conducted in secret, between Senators Manchin and Schumer in July 2022. Environmentalist Fred Krupp described Deese as "indispensable in crafting and negotiating the most important climate law in U.S. history." Beyond IRA passage, Deese developed a reputation for weaving climate action into the fabric of White House economic policymaking.

As NEC director, Deese prioritized competition policy as a way to counter decades of growing corporate concentration in the economy. He pushed to establish the first-ever White House Competition Council, which he chairs, and has spoken publicly on the need to increase entrepreneurship and reduce barriers to entry in key U.S. industries.

In February 2023, it was announced that Deese would be leaving his position. Vice Chair of the Federal Reserve Lael Brainard was selected as his replacement.

References

External links
 
 "Brian Deese, Senior Advisor." The White House.

|-

|-

|-

1978 births
Living people
Biden administration personnel
Center for American Progress people
Deputy Directors for Management of the Office of Management and Budget
Directors of the Office of Management and Budget
Middlebury College alumni
People from Belmont, Massachusetts
Obama administration cabinet members
Obama administration personnel
Senior Advisors to the President of the United States
United States presidential advisors
Yale Law School alumni